Olwyn Byron is a British physicist who is Professor of Biophysics at the University of Glasgow and Chair of the British Biophysical Society. She was a member of the Physics of Life UK Network steering group who were awarded the 2020 Institute of Physics Rosalind Franklin Medal and Prize.

Early life and education 
Byron was an undergraduate student at Durham University. She moved to the University of Aberdeen as a graduate student, where she earned a master's degree in biophysics. Byron moved to the University of Nottingham, where her doctoral research considered structure-property investigations into B72.3.

Research and career 
In 1992, Byron joined the faculty at the University of Leicester, where she worked in applied bimolecular technology. She joined the University of Glasgow in 1997 and was promoted to Professor in 2016.

Byron studies the solution behaviour of macromolecules and complexes. She is interested in the solution shape of molecules and the strength of the complexes that they form. She serves on the steering group of the Physics of Life network, a team of biologists and physicists who look to develop a comprehensive understanding of biological processes across multiple length scales, from molecules to systems. These findings will help to inform a new generation of vaccines against influenza. Byron was elected Chair of the British Biophysical Society in 2018.

Awards and honours 
 2020 Institute of Physics Rosalind Franklin Medal and Prize Physics of Life UK Network (PoLNET) steering group

Selected publications

References 

Living people
Alumni of the University of Nottingham
Alumni of the University of Aberdeen
Alumni of Durham University
British physicists
21st-century British scientists
British women scientists
20th-century British scientists
Academics of the University of Glasgow
Year of birth missing (living people)